Razdolny is a rural locality (a settlement) in Basakinskoye Rural Settlement, Chernyshkovsky District, Volgograd Oblast, Russia. The population was 17 as of 2010. There are 2 streets.

Geography 
Razdolny is located 44 km southwest of Chernyshkovsky (the district's administrative centre) by road. Rossoshansky is the nearest rural locality.

References 

Rural localities in Chernyshkovsky District